Agistri, also Angistri or Agkistri (Greek: Αγκίστρι , English: "fishing hook"), is a small populated island and municipality in the Saronic Gulf in the Islands regional unit, Greece.

Settlements
There are only three settlements on Agistri - Milos (Megalochori), Skala and Limenaria. Milos (pop. 566) is the main village where the majority of the Greek population of the island lives. Skala (pop. 448) is a twenty-minute walk from Milos along the coastal road. Skala is where most of the tourist facilities and hotels are. Limenaria (pop. 128) is a very small village on the other side of the island with very little tourism. The island's population is 1,142 inhabitants according to the 2011 Greek census.

History
The island was settled by Arvanites likely starting in the late 17th century. The community still inhabits the island.

Geography
Agistri is a pine-covered island in the Saronic Islands group.

Agistri is very close to the larger Saronic island of Aegina. The island can be reached from Aegina by a number of boats in just ten minutes. These boats include the Agistri Express and a number of small "water taxis". The island is also an hour's boat ride from the large Athenian port of Piraeus.

Flora and fauna 
Agistri is home to a wide variety of plants such as wild cyclamen, thyme, caper bushes, and thistles. The center of the island is covered in Pine forest. It hosts a population of chukar partridges. The rocky eastern coast is used as a breeding place by swifts. Noteworthy is a population of peafowls, which have been introduced to the island and since become feral.

Local economies 
Agistri's primary industry is tourism. Both in Skala and Megalochori there are numerous hotels and restaurants. Local transport includes a bus and taxis. Popular beaches are Aponissos and Dragonera on the western coast, the beaches of Megalochori and Skala in the north, Mariza in the south, and Skliri and Halikiada in the east. Halikiada is popular for naturism. The island also has a long history of free camping, though it is no longer allowed to erect tents in the forest due to fire hazard. Agriculture also forms part of the island's economy.

On 18 September 2015, Wall Street investor Brian Kelly announced he would be investing in the Nxt-based platform Drachmae, which has as its aim the revitalisation of the local economy of the Greek Island Agistri.

Gallery

References

External links

Official website
Tourist website
AgistriGreece.com Tourist Guide

Saronic Islands
Municipalities of Attica
Populated places in Islands (regional unit)
Islands of Attica
Islands of Greece
Landforms of Islands (regional unit)
Arvanite settlements